Springhill High School was a co-educational secondary school on Turf Hill Road in Rochdale, Greater Manchester, England. The catchment area consists of the neighbouring areas: Newbold, Kirkholt, Deeplish, Turf Hill and Belfield.

The school closed 31 August 2010 as a result of the Building Schools for the Future program. The school merged with Balderstone Technology College and formed a new school called Kingsway Park High School. The new school is based on the old Spring Hill High School site.

References

External links 
 Springhill High School in Rochdale

Defunct schools in the Metropolitan Borough of Rochdale
Educational institutions disestablished in 2010
2010 disestablishments in England
Schools in Rochdale